Pseudeminia is a genus of flowering plants in the legume family, Fabaceae. It belongs to the subfamily Faboideae. It includes 4 species in tropical Africa.

References 

Phaseoleae
Fabaceae genera